Bernard Pusey (born 1931), is a male former cyclist who competed for England.

Cycling career
He represented England and won a bronze medal in the road race at the 1954 British Empire and Commonwealth Games in Vancouver, Canada.

He was a member of Redhill Cycling Club.

References

1931 births
English male cyclists
Cyclists at the 1954 British Empire and Commonwealth Games
Commonwealth Games medallists in cycling
Commonwealth Games bronze medallists for England
Living people
Medallists at the 1954 British Empire and Commonwealth Games